Pholosong Hospital is located in Tsakane, Gauteng, South Africa. The hospital serves a population of 900,000 from Tsakane, Kwa-Thema and Duduza.

History
Construction of the hospital was completed in 1992 and the hospital first admitted patients that same year. The hospital celebrated its 20th anniversary in March 2012.

Features and capacity
The hospital has 300 permanent beds and almost 1000 medical staff.

As of 2010, the hospital admitted approximately 20,000 patients annually. The hospital is responsible for approximately 5000 live births per year. In 2010,  the hospital treated 118,399 trauma patients.

The hospital provides Paediatric, Obstetrics and Gynaecology services, HIV, TB and STI treatment and Antenatal care.

See also
Healthcare in South Africa

References

Hospital buildings completed in 1992
Hospitals in Gauteng
Hospitals established in 1992
Ekurhuleni
20th-century architecture in South Africa